Trivelino (or Trivelin) is a zanni character of the commedia dell'arte.

Trivelino is similar to Arlecchino, like him, he represents a stupid servant or valet. Trivelino is also similar to Scapin, Brighella, or Mezzetin.

This character was introduced in France by Domenico Locatelli in the third quarter of the 17th century.  Pierre de Marivaux later used him in several of his comedies including Arlequin poli par l'amour, L'Île des esclaves and La Double Inconstance.

References

Fictional characters introduced in the 17th century
Stupid Zanni class characters